is a castle in Kitakyushu, Japan.  It was built by Hosokawa Tadaoki starting in 1602, with construction completed in 1608.

History
Construction of Kokura Castle began in 1602 and was completed in 1608.  It was the property of the Ogasawara clan (from Harima) between 1632 and 1860.

The castle burnt down from a fire in 1837, with parts of it rebuilt in 1839.  The castle was burnt down intentionally in 1866 by retreating Kokura troops during its skirmish against the Chōshū clan during the Second Chōshū expedition.

Mori Ōgai was based at the castle at the turn of the 20th century, when it was a military base.

The keep was reconstructed in 1959, and the castle was fully restored in 1990. Matsumoto Seicho Memorial Museum and castle garden were opened in 1998.

Location
The castle is about a ten-minute walk from JR Kyushu's Kokura Station. 
The north side of the moat is next to the Riverwalk shopping complex (completed in 2003).

Attractions
The castle keep contains a modern folkloric museum and admission is charged to the keep (350 yen), garden (300 yen) and Matsumoto Seicho Memorial Museum (600 yen). A joint ticket to the three attractions costs 700 yen.

The keep is not an accurate reconstruction. When it was reconstructed in 1959, the designers opted for a more aesthetically appealing design instead of faithfully rebuilding the simpler structure that once stood on the site.

Kokura Castle was listed as one of the Continued Top 100 Japanese Castles in 2017.

An old Japanese-style pre-Brunton lighthouse from Shirasu (白洲) is on the castle grounds.

Literature

See also
Furuichi Ryōwa

External links
Kokura Castle - Kitakyushu film commission
Kokura Castle (Japanese)
Kokura Castle (English)
Kokura Castle - Japan Kyushu Tourist

1602 establishments in Japan
Buildings and structures in Kitakyushu
Castles in Fukuoka Prefecture
Museums in Fukuoka Prefecture
Ogasawara clan
Ōshū-Hosokawa clan
Tourist attractions in Kitakyushu